The Caucasian toad (Bufo verrucosissimus) is a species of toad in the family Bufonidae. It is found in Azerbaijan, Georgia, Lebanon, Iran, Russia, and Turkey. Its natural habitats are temperate forests, subtropical or tropical moist lowland forests, intermittent rivers, rural gardens, ponds, and aquaculture ponds.
It is threatened by habitat loss.

Gallery

References

External links

Bufo
Amphibians of Asia
Amphibians of Europe
Amphibians of Azerbaijan
Fauna of the Middle East
Near threatened animals
Amphibians described in 1814
Taxonomy articles created by Polbot